Paul van Waarden may refer to:
 Paul van Waarden (chef) (born 1966), Dutch chef
 Paul van Waarden (restaurant), former Dutch Michelin starred restaurant, owned by the eponymous chef